The Palácio do Planalto in Brasília is the official workplace of the president of Brazil. The building was designed by Oscar Niemeyer in 1958 and inaugurated on 21 April 1960. It has been the workplace of every Brazilian president since Juscelino Kubitschek. It is located at the Praça dos Três Poderes (Three Powers Plaza), to the east of the National Congress of Brazil and across from the Supreme Federal Court.

It is one of the official palaces of the Presidency, along with the Palácio da Alvorada, the official residence. Besides the president, other high ranking government officials also work from the Planalto, including the Vice-President and the Chief of Staff; the other government ministry buildings are located on the Ministries Esplanade. As the seat of government, the term Planalto is often used as a metonym for the executive branch of the federal government.

The building, constructed in the modernist style, is part of the Brasília World Heritage Site, designated by UNESCO in 1987.

History 
The presidential palace was a major feature of the plan for the newly established federal capital, Brasília. Oscar Niemeyer was chosen as the architect of the Palácio do Planalto and the building's construction, led by Construtora Rabello S.A., began on 10 July 1958. The Executive Office was temporarily headquartered at the Catetinho, on the outskirts of Brasília, during construction.

The palace was officially inaugurated on 21 April 1960, by President Juscelino Kubitschek. It was one of the first buildings inaugurated in the new capital city, along with the National Congress and the Supreme Federal Court. The inauguration ceremony was attended by several foreign leaders and attracted thousands of spectators, as it symbolised the transfer of the capital city from Rio de Janeiro to the center of the country.

The palace owes its name to the Brazilian Highlands (the term planalto meaning highland), specifically the Brazilian Central Plateau, where Brasília is located.

2009–2010 restoration 

In March 2009, President Luiz Inácio Lula da Silva ordered an extensive restoration of the palace. Decades of poor maintenance had taken a great toll on the structure built in 1958. The restoration was completed on 24 August 2010, at a cost of R$ 111 million. The restoration focused on: installing new electricity, water and central air conditioning systems; complete dismantling of the interior spaces and construction of new interior divisions; restoration of the exterior marble and granite façade; construction of an underground parking garage for 500 vehicles; substitution of the electrical generators; restoration of windows and doors; construction of emergency stairs; and technology upgrades

During the restoration process, the Executive Office was transferred temporarily to the Centro Cultural Banco do Brasil ('Bank of Brazil Cultural Center') and to the Itamaraty Palace.

2023 storming 

On 8 January 2023, the building was attacked by supporters of former president Jair Bolsonaro.

Architecture 

The presidential palace was a major feature of Costa's plan for the newly established capital city. Niemeyer's idea was to project an image of simplicity and modernity using fine lines and waves to compose the columns and exterior structures. The longitudinal lines of the palace are kept by a sequence of columns whose design is a variation of those at the Palácio da Alvorada, although they were arranged transversely to the body of the building. The palace's façade is also composed by two strong elements: the ramp leading to the hall and the parlatorium (speaker's platform), from where the president and foreign heads of state can address the public at the Three Powers Plaza.

A reflecting pool was built in 1991 to increase security around the palace and to balance humidity levels during the long dry season in Brasília. Several Japanese carp live in the pool.

Layout and amenities 
The main building has four floors above ground and one floor underground. The heliport is located by the north façade of the building.

First floor 
The first floor consists of the main reception area, access control and security, entrance hall and press office. The large entrance hall is used frequently for temporary exhibitions on themes related to the federal government's programs. The hall features a sculpture by Franz Weissman and three sculptures by Zezinho de Tracunhaém. Also located on the first floor is the Presidential Gallery, housing the official portraits of the former presidents of Brazil.

Second floor 
The second floor houses the East, Noble and West rooms, as well as the Supreme Meeting Room and Press Secretariat. The East Room is where the president signs decrees and other pieces of legislation. The Noble Room, also called the Mirror Hall, is the largest in the palace. It is used for large ceremonies, with a capacity to hold 1,000 guests. The highlights in this hall are Haroldo Barroso's sculpture Evoluções and Djanira da Motta e Silva's painting Os Orixás. The West Room was designed for medium-sized events, with a capacity to hold from 300 to 500 people. Due to its ample size and generous ceiling height, it is primarily used for events based on international themes. A large panel created by Roberto Burle Marx decorates the area. The Supreme Meeting Room was built in 1990 and is normally used for ministerial, government and presidential meetings.

Third floor 

The third floor houses the office of the president and their senior staff. It also houses the mezzanine, a large area composed of waiting rooms and a circulation area between the Noble Room, the presidential office and the offices of the senior advisors. The waiting rooms are decorated with furniture by Sergio Rodrigues and Oscar Niemeyer, and paintings by Emiliano Di Cavalcanti, Firmino Saldanha, Frans Krajcberg, Geraldo de Barros and Frank Schaeffer. The bronze sculpture called O Flautista, by Bruno Giorgi, used to ornament the area but was destroyed during the invasion of Congress on 8 January 2023.

The president's office consists of three separate environments: office, meeting room and guest room. The president's office is decorated with modernist Brazilian furniture dating from the 1940s to the 1960s, and silverware from the Catete Palace. The highlights in this room are two large paintings by Djanira da Motta e Silva: Colhendo Bananas and Praia do Nordeste. The meeting room is used for private meetings between the president and members of their direct staff. The guest room is used for formal meetings between the president and foreign heads of state and government.

Fourth floor 
The fourth floor contains a large lounge area and the offices of senior government officials, including the Chief of Staff and the Chief of the Institutional Security Cabinet. The lounge area was created during the 2010 restoration and is decorated with modernist Brazilian furniture from the 1960s. Highlights in the lounge include: a tapestry by Alberto Nicola; a draft of Tiradentes' bust, by Bruno Giorgi; and Cena Indígena, by Giovanni Oppido. Two large panels by Athos Bulcão are also seen on the side walls that lead to the lounge.

Public access and security 

The Palace is open to public visitation on Sundays, from 9:30 am to 2 pm. Guided tours last 20 minutes. During the week, access to the building is restricted to authorised personnel. It is difficult to see the president, as they are often escorted into the Palace through the north entrance or arrives by helicopter. The ramp in front of the Palace is only used during special ceremonies, such as presidential inaugurations and state visits by foreign heads of state and government.

The building is protected by the Presidential Guard Battalion and by the 1st Guards Cavalry Regiment ('Independence Dragoons'), of the Brazilian Army. The ceremonial guard sentry duties are rotated among those two units every six months, and a change of the guard ceremony takes place to mark the rotation.

Gallery

See also 
 Alvorada Palace
 Granja do Torto
 Rio Negro Palace
 Catete Palace
 Paço Imperial
 Palace of São Cristóvão
 Petrópolis Imperial Palace
 List of Oscar Niemeyer works
 2023 invasion of the Brazilian Congress

References

External links 

 

1959 establishments in Brazil
Government buildings completed in 1960
Palaces in Brasília
Presidential palaces in Brazil
Modernist architecture in Brazil
Tourist attractions in Brasília
Oscar Niemeyer buildings
World Heritage Sites in Brazil
Restored and conserved buildings